Dobravica is a settlement immediately west of the town of Šentjernej in southeastern Slovenia. The area is part of the traditional region of Lower Carniola. It is now included in the Southeast Slovenia Statistical Region.

References

External links

Dobravica on Geopedia

Populated places in the Municipality of Šentjernej